Pixologic ZBrush is a digital sculpting tool that combines 3D/2.5D modeling, texturing and painting. It uses a proprietary "pixol" technology which stores lighting, color, material, orientation and depth information for the points making up all objects on the screen. The main difference between ZBrush and more traditional modeling packages is that it is more akin to traditional sculpting.

ZBrush is used for creating "high-resolution" models (able to reach 40+ million polygons) for use in movies, games, and animations, by companies ranging from ILM and Weta Digital, to Epic Games and Electronic Arts. ZBrush uses dynamic levels of resolution to allow sculptors to make global or local changes to their models. ZBrush is most known for being able to sculpt medium- to high-frequency details that were traditionally painted in bump maps. The resulting mesh details can then be exported as normal maps to be used on a low poly version of that same model. They can also be exported as a displacement map, although, in that case, the lower poly version generally requires more resolution. Or, once completed, the 3D model can be projected onto the background, becoming a 2.5D image (upon which further effects can be applied). Work can then begin on another 3D model which can be used in the same scene. This feature lets users work within complicated scenes without a heavy processor overhead.

ZBrush was developed by the company Pixologic Inc, founded by Ofer Alon (also known by the alias "Pixolator") and Jack Rimokh. The software was presented in 1999 at SIGGRAPH. The demo version, 1.55, was released in 2003, and version 3.1 was released in 2007. ZBrush 4 for Windows and Mac systems was announced on April 21, 2009 for an August release, but was later postponed. Version 3.5 was made available in September the same year, and includes some of the newer features initially intended for ZBrush 4.

Through GoZ ("Go ZBrush"), available starting in Version 4, ZBrush offers integration with other 3D graphics programs such as Autodesk Maya, Autodesk 3ds Max, Cinema 4D, LightWave 3D, Poser Pro, Daz Studio, EIAS, Modo and Blender.

ZBrush was purchased by the software company Maxon in January, 2022. Since then, ZBrush has been added to the company’s Maxon One subscription offering. Additionally, the advantage of close collaboration with Maxon’s development team has resulted in the integration of the company’s Redshift renderer into ZBrush.

Pixol
Like a pixel, each "pixol" contains information on X and Y position and color values. Additionally, it contains information on depth (or Z position), orientation and material. ZBrush-related files store pixol information, but when these maps are exported (e.g., to JPEG or PNG formats) they are flattened and the pixol data is lost. This technique is similar in concept to a voxel, another kind of 3D pixel.

Features

ZBrush comes with many features to aid in the sculpting of models and meshes.

3D Brushes
The initial ZBrush download comes with thirty 3D sculpting brushes with more available for download. Each brush offers unique attributes as well as allowing general control over hardness, intensity, and size. Alphas, used to create a specific pattern or shape, and textures are also editable brush features.

Polypaint
Polypainting allows users to paint on an object's surface without the need to first assign a texture map by adding color directly to the polygons.

Illustration
ZBrush also gives the ability to sculpt in 2.5D and comes with several brushes for that purpose. A pixol put down when sculpting or illustrating in 2.5D contains information on its own color, depth, material, position and lighting information.

Transpose
ZBrush also has a feature that is similar to skeletal animation in other 3D programs. The transpose feature allows a user to isolate a part of the model and pose it without the need of skeletal rigging.

ZSpheres
A user can create a base mesh with uniform topology and then convert it into a sculptable model by starting out with a simple sphere and extracting more "ZSpheres", until the basic shape of the desired model is created.

GoZ

Introduced in ZBrush 3.2 OS X, GoZ automates setting up shading networks for normal, displacement, and texture maps of the 3D models in GoZ-enabled applications. Upon sending the mesh back to ZBrush, GoZ will automatically remap the existing high-resolution details to the incoming mesh. GoZ will take care of operations such as correcting points & polygons order. The updated mesh is immediately ready for further detailing, map extractions, and transferring to any other GoZ-enabled application.

Best Preview Render
Also included is a full render suite known as Best Preview Render, which allows use of full 360° environment maps to light scenes using HDRI images. BPR includes a new light manipulation system called LightCaps. With it, one can not only adjust how the lights in the scene are placed around the model, but also generate environments based on it for HDRI rendering later on. It also allows for material adjustments in real-time. Material properties such as subsurface scattering are supported as are environmental and scan-line reflections. BPR also includes a set of built-in filters that can be used in realtime to create dramatic effects and corrections without even touching another photo-manipulation program.

DynaMesh
This allows ZBrush to quickly generate a new model with uniform polygon distribution, to improve the topology of models and eliminate polygon stretching.

Fibermesh
Fibermesh is a feature that allows users to grow polygon fibers out of their models or to make various botanical items. It is also a way to edit and manipulate large amounts of polygons at once with Groom brushes.

ZRemesher
It is an automatic retopology system previously called QRemesher that creates new topology based on the original mesh. The new topology is generally more clean and uniform. This process can also be guided by the user to make the new topology follow curves in the model and retain more detail to specified areas.

Shadowbox
Shadowbox allows the user to draw a rough silhouette of what they want to model, onto the inside of a virtual box. In real-time, any changes to the drawings are applied to a 3D model, upon which further details can be applied. The feature can best be utilized for hard surface modeling.

See also
 Heightmap
 Mudbox
 Sculptris
 Lightwave 3D
 Electric Image Animation System
 Cinema 4D
 Modo
 Blender

References

Further reading

External links
Pixologic ZBrush website
 ZBrush wiki
Pixol at ZBrush Wiki

3D graphics software
1999 software
Windows software
Classic Mac OS software